Scotlandia is an extinct genus of conodonts in the family Prioniodinidae.

References 

 Structure and evolution of Ordovician conodont apparatuses. Christopher R Barnes, David J. Kennedy, Alexander D. McCracken and Glen A. Tarrant, Lethaia, October 2007, volume 12, issue 2, pages 125–151,

External links 

Prioniodinida genera
Ordovician conodonts